The South Branch Sandy River is a short tributary of the Sandy River in Franklin County, Maine.

See also
List of rivers of Maine

References

Maine Streamflow Data from the USGS
Maine Watershed Data From Environmental Protection Agency

Tributaries of the Kennebec River
Rivers of Franklin County, Maine
Rivers of Maine